The Naked Brothers Band may refer to:

 The Naked Brothers Band: The Movie, a 2005 film
 The Naked Brothers Band: Music from the Movie, the soundtrack
 The Naked Brothers Band (TV series), 2007-09, a spin-off of the film
 The Naked Brothers Band (album), 2007 soundtrack
 The Naked Brothers Band (video game), 2008

See also 
 Nat and Alex Wolff, music group who wrote and performed the TV series music